Ann Harding (born Dorothy Walton Gatley; August 7, 1902 – September 1, 1981) was an American theatre, motion picture, radio, and television actress.  A regular player on Broadway and in regional theater in the 1920s, in the 1930s Harding was one of the first actresses to gain fame in the new medium of "talking pictures," and she was nominated for the Academy Award for Best Actress in 1931 for her work in Holiday.

Harding was born Dorothy Walton Gatley and was the daughter of a prominent United States Army officer. She was raised primarily in East Orange, New Jersey and graduated from East Orange High School.  Having gained her initial acting experience in school drama classes, she decided on a career as an actress and moved to New York City.  Because her father opposed her career choice, she used the stage name Ann Harding.

After initial work as a script reader, Harding began to win roles on Broadway and in regional theaters, primarily in Pennsylvania.  She moved to California to begin working in movies, which were just then beginning to include sound.

Her work in plays had given her notable diction and stage presence, and she became a leading lady.  By the late 1930s, she was becoming stereotyped as the beautiful, innocent, self-sacrificing woman, and film work became harder for her to obtain.  After marrying conductor Werner Janssen in 1937, she worked only sporadically, with three notable roles coming in Eyes in the Night (1942), It Happened on Fifth Avenue (1947) and The Man in the Gray Flannel Suit (1956).

She worked occasionally in television between 1955 and 1965, and she appeared in two plays in the early 1960s, returning to the stage after an absence of over 30 years, including the lead in The Corn is Green in 1964 at the Studio Theater in Buffalo, New York.

After her 1965 retirement, she resided in Sherman Oaks, California. She died there in 1981 and was interred at Forest Lawn Memorial Park -- Hollywood Hills.

Early years
Harding was born Dorothy Walton Gatley at Fort Sam Houston in San Antonio, Texas to George G. Gatley, a career army officer, and Elizabeth "Bessie" Walton (Crabb) Gatley. After travelling often during her early life because of her father's career, she grew up in East Orange, New Jersey, graduated from East Orange High School, and attended Bryn Mawr College. Her father "violently opposed her profession," so Harding changed her name when she began her acting career.

Career

Harding's initial employment in the entertainment industry was as a script reader. She began acting and made her Broadway debut in Like a King in 1921. Three years later she found her "home theater" in Rose Valley, Pennsylvania, after being directed by Hedgerow Theatre founder Jasper Deeter in The Master Builder. Over the years she returned to Hedgerow to reprise several of her roles. She soon became a leading lady; like other leading actresses of the day, she kept in shape by using the services of Sylvia of Hollywood. She was a prominent actress in Pittsburgh theatre for a time, performing with the Sharp Company and later starting the Nixon Players with Harry Bannister. In 1929, she made her film debut in Paris Bound, opposite Fredric March. In 1931, she purchased the Hedgerow Theatre building from Deeter for $5,000 and donated it to the company.

First under contract to Pathé, which was subsequently absorbed by RKO Pictures, Harding was promoted as the studio's 'answer' to Metro-Goldwyn-Mayer's superstar Norma Shearer. She co-starred with Ronald Colman, Laurence Olivier, Myrna Loy, Herbert Marshall, Leslie Howard, Richard Dix, and Gary Cooper, and was often on loan to other studios, such as MGM and Paramount. At RKO, Harding, along with Helen Twelvetrees and Constance Bennett, comprised a trio who specialized in the "women's pictures" genre.

Harding's performances were often heralded by the critics, who cited her diction and stage experience as assets to the then-new medium of "talking pictures." Harding's second film was Her Private Affair, in which she portrayed a wife of questionable morality. The film was an enormous commercial success. During this period, she was generally considered to be one of cinema's most beautiful actresses, with her waist-length blonde hair being one of her most noted physical attributes. Films during her peak include The Animal Kingdom, Peter Ibbetson, When Ladies Meet, The Flame Within, and Biography of a Bachelor Girl. Harding, however, eventually became stereotyped as the innocent, self-sacrificing young woman. Following lukewarm responses by both critics and the public to several of her later 1930s films, she eventually stopped making movies after she married the conductor Werner Janssen in 1937. She returned to the big screen in 1942 to make Eyes in the Night and to take secondary roles in other films. She played "Mary," the estranged wife of Charlie Ruggles, in the Christmas film It Happened on Fifth Avenue in 1947. In 1956, she again starred with Fredric March, this time in The Man in the Gray Flannel Suit.

The 1960s marked Harding's return to Broadway after an absence of decades—having last appeared in 1927. In 1962, she starred in General Seeger, directed by and co-starring George C. Scott, and in 1964 she appeared in Abraham Cochrane ("her last New York stage appearance"). Both productions had brief runs, with the former play lasting a mere three performances (including previews). Harding made her final acting performance in 1965 in an episode of television's Ben Casey before retiring.

Personal life
Harding was married twice, her husbands being:

Harry Bannister, an actor. They married in 1926 and divorced in 1932 in Reno, Nevada. A New York Times article (May 8, 1932) about the divorce stated that the actress still loved her husband and only agreed to a divorce to help Bannister's stymied career. "The proceedings were among the most unusual in the history of Nevada's liberal divorce laws," the newspaper reported. "Only through dissolution of their marriage could he escape, they said, from being overshadowed by Miss Harding's rise to stardom." The divorce also resulted in what was described as "a bitter court fight ... over custody of their daughter", Jane Harding (1928-2005, Mrs. Alfred P. Otto). According to an interview with Harding's biographer, Scott O'Brien, Jane Harding said, "I had a terrible childhood. I hated my nurse. I never saw Mother. She was always busy." 
Werner Janssen, the conductor. Harding and Janssen married in 1937 and divorced in 1963, with Harding claiming that her husband had controlled her throughout their marriage, keeping her from her friends and isolating her from the world. By this marriage, Harding had two stepchildren, Alice and Werner Jr.

Among Harding's romances was the novelist and screenwriter Gene Fowler. In the early 1960s, Harding began living with Grace Kaye, an adult companion, later known as Grace Kaye Harding. Ann Harding referred to Kaye as her daughter.

Death
On September 1, 1981, Harding died at the age of 79 in Sherman Oaks, California. After cremation, her urn was placed in the Court of Remembrance wall at Forest Lawn Memorial Park in Hollywood Hills, California.

She was survived by a daughter and four grandchildren.

Recognition
Harding was nominated for the Academy Award for Best Actress for Holiday in 1931. 
For her contributions to the motion picture and television industries, Harding has two stars on the Hollywood Walk of Fame — one in the Motion Pictures section 6201 Hollywood Boulevard and one in the Television section at 6850 Hollywood Boulevard.

Broadway stage credits

Filmography

Films

Television

References

External links

 
 
 Photographs of Ann Harding
 General Seeger
 

1902 births
1981 deaths
Actresses from San Antonio
American film actresses
American radio actresses
American stage actresses
American television actresses
Bryn Mawr College alumni
Burials at Forest Lawn Memorial Park (Hollywood Hills)
RKO Pictures contract players
Actors from East Orange, New Jersey
East Orange High School alumni
People from San Antonio
20th-century American actresses